Wilmington Christian School (WCS) is a private, non-denominational college preparatory Christian school. Founded in 1946 in the city of Wilmington, Delaware, it has since consolidated its elementary and secondary schools to a  campus in the suburban Hockessin area and enrolls over 400 students in Pre-K3 through 12th grade.

WCS is a parent-based corporation represented by nearly 100 local churches in Delaware, Maryland, New Jersey, and Pennsylvania, with oversight provided by an elected Board of Directors. They list as their mission to provide "a Christ-centered, challenging academic program with instruction based on the Biblical view of God and the world," and encourage students to integrate biblical truth into their daily life and to impact the culture for Jesus Christ.

WCS is accredited by the Middle States Association of Colleges and Schools, and a member of
the Mid-Atlantic Christian School Association (MACSA), and the Delaware Association of Independent Schools.

WCS competes in the Independent Conference for interscholastic sports.

References

External links
 

Christian schools in Delaware
Educational institutions established in 1946
Nondenominational Christian schools in the United States
High schools in New Castle County, Delaware
Schools in New Castle County, Delaware
Private elementary schools in Delaware
Private middle schools in Delaware
Private high schools in Delaware
Preparatory schools in Delaware
1946 establishments in Delaware